Regiment Overvaal is a reserve force regiment of the South African Army Air Defence Artillery Formation.

History

Origin
8 Light Anti-Aircraft (8 LAA) was established in 1969 as a Medium Light Anti-Aircraft Regiment and was based on the Vereeniging Military Base. The unit was established without any troops. P Battery of Regiment Vaalrivier was therefore subsequently transferred on 1 October 1969 to form 8 LAA.

Organisation
The first Officer Commanding was Commandant R.D.J. Coetzee and the first RSM WO1 C.S. Feldtmann.

Major R.D.J. Coetzee was appointed as the acting Commanding Officer on formation of the unit and was accompanied by 420 members consisting of:
 11 officers (2 majors, 1 captain, 3 lieutenants and 5 second lieutenants)
 40 NCOs (1 WO2, 6 sergeants, 22 bombardiers and 11 lance-bombardiers)
 369 Gunners

Renamed
8 LAA was renamed on 27 April 1973 as Regiment Overvaal.

Higher HQ
Regiment Overvaal fell under the regional jurisdiction of Witwatersrand Command from 1969 to 1974.

Divisional Command
Regiment Overvaal was assigned to support 8th Armoured Division from 1974 to 1984.

Regiment Overvaal then was assigned to Far Northern Command from 1984 to 1987.

The regiment was finally returned to 8th Armoured Division from 1987 to 1997.

Freedom of Entry
The Regiment was awarded the Right and Privilege of Freedom of Entry into Vereeniging on the 6 September 1986 with Commandant. P.J. Viljoen accepting that honour. This Freedom was exercised in the 15 September 1990 with Commandant. P.J.Roetz commanding.

Equipment
Regiment Overvaal is a unit which executes the Anti-Aircraft task independently, or in support of other arms using radar controlled Oerlikon GDF guns.
These cannon can be used in all-weather conditions against low flying aircraft and can, if necessary be used in a ground role as well.

Operational Service 
 Ops Savannah 1976 (SWA)
 Sector 10 – 1979/1980/1981 (SWA)
 Sector 10 – 1983/1984 (SWA)
 Ops Pebble – 1984/1985/1986 (Soutpansberg Military Area – Far North Command)
 Ops Hilti – 1988 (81 Brigade - (SWA))
 Ops Eardrum – 1990 (Pietermaritzburg – Natal Command)
 Ops Jambu – 1994 (eShowe – Natal Command)

Riot Control 
Mamelodi, Shoshanguwe and KwaNdebele - 1987/1988

Insignia

Previous Insignia

Leadership

References

Artillery regiments of South Africa
Artillery units and formations of South Africa
Military units and formations of South Africa in the Border War
Military units and formations of South Africa
Military units and formations established in 1969
Military units and formations disestablished in 1973